Vicente Asensi Albentosa (28 January 1919 – 2 September 2000) was a football player who spent all his career at Valencia CF where he played 308 games and scored 33 goals. Together with Epi, Amadeo, Mundo and Gorostiza they made up one of the best attacks in the 1940s. He played as left winger during most of his career but was moved further back as he grew older and ended up playing as a defender. At international level, he also gained six caps with the Spain national football team between 1945 and 1950.

External links
 
 Valencia CF profile 
 National team data 
 
 

1919 births
People from Costera
Sportspeople from the Province of Valencia
Spanish footballers
Association football midfielders
La Liga players
Valencia CF players
Spain international footballers
1950 FIFA World Cup players
Spanish football managers
CD Castellón managers
2000 deaths